"...Something to Be" is the title track and fourth single from Matchbox Twenty frontman Rob Thomas's solo debut album, ...Something to Be (2005). The song features guitar work from fellow Matchbox Twenty member Kyle Cook and Tom Petty and the Heartbreakers guitarist Mike Campbell. Released on March 13, 2006, the song peaked at  40 in Australia.

Track listing
Australian CD single
 "...Something to Be"
 "...Something to Be" (AOL Sessions)
 "I Am an Illusion" (XM Sessions)

Credits and personnel
Credits are adapted from the Australian CD single liner notes and the ...Something to Be booklet.

Studios
 Recorded at The Hit Factory (New York City), BiCoastal Music (Ossining, New York), Conway Studios, and Henson Studios (Los Angeles)
 Mixed at The Hit Factory (New York City)
 Mastered at Gateway Mastering (Portland, Maine, US)

Personnel

 Rob Thomas – writing, vocals
 Wendy Melvoin – guitar
 Mike Campbell – guitar
 Kyle Cook – guitar
 Mike Elizondo – bass
 Matt Serletic – keys, production
 Gerald Heyward – drums
 Cassidy – background vocals
 Matt Beck – background vocals
 Gary Grant – trumpet
 Jerry Hey – trumpet, horn arrangement

 Brandon Fields – saxophone
 Reginald Young – trombone
 Jimmy Douglass – recording, mixing
 Greg Collins – recording
 Mark Dobson – recording, digital editing
 John O'Brien – programming
 Bob Ludwig – mastering
 Ria Lewerke – art direction
 Norman Moore – art direction
 Jeremy Cowort – photography

Charts

References

2005 songs
2006 singles
Atlantic Records singles
Rob Thomas (musician) songs
Song recordings produced by Matt Serletic
Songs written by Rob Thomas (musician)